The Inkpot is a  sinkhole located at the Salt Creek Wilderness Area north of Roswell, New Mexico. This geological formation can be found at the foot of the scenic Red Bluffs protected area. It is light green in color, and features a hidden cave leading to the water. It is home to great horned owls, barn owls, and the Pecos pupfish.

See also 
 List of sinkholes of the United States

References

Sinkholes of the United States
Landforms of Chaves County, New Mexico
Landforms of New Mexico